Kim Gwang-seon (born 8 April 1946) is a former South Korean cyclist. He competed in the sprint and the 1000m time trial at the 1968 Summer Olympics.

References

External links
 

1946 births
Living people
South Korean male cyclists
Olympic cyclists of South Korea
Cyclists at the 1968 Summer Olympics
Sportspeople from Seoul
Asian Games medalists in cycling
Cyclists at the 1966 Asian Games
Cyclists at the 1970 Asian Games
Medalists at the 1966 Asian Games
Medalists at the 1970 Asian Games
Asian Games silver medalists for South Korea
Asian Games bronze medalists for South Korea